The 1949 Montana Grizzlies football team represented the University of Montana in the 1949 college football season as a member of the Pacific Coast Conference (PCC). The Grizzlies were led by first-year head coach Ted Shipkey, played their home games on campus at Dornblaser Field in Missoula and finished with a record of five wins and four losses (5–4, 0–3 PCC).

Schedule

References

External links
Game program: Montana at Washington State – September 24, 1949

Montana
Montana Grizzlies football seasons
Montana Grizzlies football